A list of Bangladesh films released in 1976.

Releases

See also

 1976 in Bangladesh
 List of Bangladeshi films of 1977
 List of Bangladeshi films
 Cinema of Bangladesh

References

Footnotes

Bibliography

External links 
 Bangladeshi films on Internet Movie Database

Film
Bangladesh
 1976